The Institut Universitaire de France (IUF, Academic Institute of France), is a service of the French Ministry of Higher Education that distinguishes each year a small number of university professors for their research excellence, as evidenced by their international recognition. It was created to become a new "Collège de France", located in French universities. Only 2% of French university professors have been currently distinguished by the Institut Universitaire de France.

Organization
The Institute was created by decree on 26 of August, 1991. It is an organization without walls, whose members remain in their own universities. At least two thirds of the members of the IUF belong to universities outside Paris. The purpose of the IUF is to give full freedom to its members to pursue and disseminate their research. About 2% of total French faculties are members (active or honorary) of the IUF. Each year a symposium brings together members of the IUF in order to allow exchanges at the highest level of French research.

The IUF is composed of two types of members, all faculty members, professors or lecturers, posted in a French university:
Senior Members, who have reached international recognition;
Junior Members (under 40 years old), who are promising young scholars.

In addition, about ten foreign teachers may be invited each year. Members are elected for five years (not renewable for junior members, renewable once for senior members).

Members remain in their home university. They benefit from a reduction of two thirds of their statutory teaching duties. Research funds are credited to their team or laboratory (15,000 € per year). They automatically receive the national award of scientific excellence (PEDR): 6,000 € for junior members, 10,000 euros € for senior members. A progress report is requested their mid-term and at the end of their term. IUF members must contribute to the scientific reputation locally, nationally and internationally in a deliberate effort to interdisciplinarity.

Jury Selection
Selection boards are partially renewed each year. They have many international members and international character is one of the specificities of the IUF. The use of top international experts avoids any risk of cooptation and guarantees the high quality of appointments to the IUF.

Since 2009, the jury is officially made up for more than half of foreign scientists known for their international reputation. These are the Collège de France, the Academy of Sciences, Academy of Moral and Political Sciences, the National Academy of Medicine, the Conference of University Presidents, the CP-CNU offering the names of persons approached to compose the jury . Its composition is then released and the CV of its members. The jury called for the assessment of candidates' portfolios, to the rapporteurs of high scientific level, at least twice a candidate to have a disciplinary notice informed. If the CVs submitted by the rapporteurs ensure scientific excellence, statements of interest guarantee their independence vis-à-vis the files they load. New members of the Institute, besides the discharge of service and staffing dedicated to the scientific environment of 15,000 euros since 2012 (20,000 euros until 2011), receive a bonus of 10,000 euros, which represents twice the former RDD.

These changes are partly related to appointments at the Institut Universitaire de France in September, 2008 which caused considerable controversy. The controversy concerns the appointment of additional members, including Michel Maffesoli, of whom economist and president of the jury Elie Cohen said he "would never have been selected by the jury even if there were more places". Some jurors senior and junior of the Institute had protested against these appointments by circulating the September 24, 2008, a declaration that they were indignant "lack of transparency and nominations for 2008". This challenge was supported by the Society Industrial and Applied Mathematics (SMAI) and the French Association for Scientific Information (AFIS).

See also 
 CNRS Gold medal

References

French science and technology awards
1991 establishments in France